Papilio gallienus, the narrow-banded swallowtail, is a butterfly of the family Papilionidae. It is found in Nigeria, Cameroon, the Democratic Republic of the Congo and the central part of the Republic of the Congo.

Taxonomy
Papilio gallienus is very similar to Papilio mechowi but males of gallienus have a distinct androconial patch and the discal spots of the forewings have diffuse edges. The outer edge of the forewing discal band is straighter in gallienus. Both are members of the zenobia species group. In the zenobia group the basic upperside wing pattern is black with white or yellowish bands and spots. The underside is brown and basally there is a red area marked with black stripes and spots. In the discal area there is a yellowish band with black stripes and veins. Females resemble Amauris butterflies. Both sexes lack tails.

The clade members are:
Papilio cyproeofila Butler, 1868
Papilio fernandus Fruhstorfer, 1903
Papilio filaprae Suffert, 1904
Papilio gallienus Distant, 1879
Papilio mechowi Dewitz, 1881
Papilio mechowianus Dewitz, 1885
Papilio nobicea Suffert, 1904
Papilio zenobia Fabricius, 1775

Description
It is very similar to Papilio cyproeofila but has cream-yellow rather than cream-white bands, and the hindwing band is much narrower than in P. cyproeofila and curved on the inner edge.

References

External links
Butterfly Corner Images from Naturhistorisches Museum Wien

Butterflies described in 1879
gallienus
Butterflies of Africa
Taxa named by William Lucas Distant